Kansas's 4th congressional district is a congressional district in the U.S. state of Kansas. Based in the south central part of the state, the district encompasses the city of Wichita, the largest city in Kansas, three universities, Arkansas City, and the state of Kansas's only national airport.

Political history summary

General history
The 4th congressional district is historically a strongly Republican district, almost exclusively represented, over the last half century, by Republicans—with the sole exception of moderate Democrat Dan Glickman, who lost his bid for re-election to a 10th term in 1994.

As of mid-April 2017 (following a special election to fill the district seat left vacant by Mike Pompeo's resignation to become CIA Director), no other Democrat has won election to the Congressional seat lost by Glickman, which has since gone to conservative, anti-abortion Republicans, routinely, by a roughly two-to-one margin in subsequent races—with the exception of the April 11, 2017 special election, in which Democrat James Thompson managed to narrow the gap with Republican victor Ron Estes to only 6.2%.

Abortion issues
Since the 1980s (and peaking with the 1991 Summer of Mercy protests), the district's major city, Wichita (where most 4th district voters reside), is often referred to in national media as the center, or "ground zero," of the nation's anti-abortion movement—a primary factor that Glickman has credited for his defeat,—and which has remained a major influence in 4th district politics, with all three of Glickman's successors (Todd Tiahrt, Mike Pompeo and Ron Estes) claiming strong anti-abortion views.  In the 2017 Special Election to fill Pompeo's vacated seat, a critical factor in Estes' unusually narrow victory over the Democrat (James Thompson) was a string of last-minute ads tying Thompson to his pro-abortion stance.

Redistricting
In 2012, a feud between conservative and moderate Republicans in the Kansas Legislature stymied progress on mandatory decennial redistricting (boundary changes to reflect new demographic data from the 10-year Census). With elections approaching, the federal courts intervened and drew the district boundaries, shifting the fourth district westward, into more conservative territory.

2016–2018 elections
In the 2016 general election, incumbent Republican Mike Pompeo was overwhelmingly re-elected to the seat, with a 31% (85,000-vote) lead over his Democratic rival. However, President-elect Donald Trump then nominated him as Director of the Central Intelligence Agency, and upon Pompeo's Congressional confirmation as CIA Director in January 2017, Pompeo resigned his Congressional seat, leaving it vacant—forcing Kansas Governor Sam Brownback to call a special election, set for April 11, 2017, to fill Pompeo's vacated Congressional seat.

2016 regular election
In the 2016 national elections, the district's Republican nominees for President (Trump) and Congressman (Pompeo) overwhelmingly defeated the Democratic nominees (Clinton and Giroux), by two-to-one margins in the 4th district. (as happened with Pompeo's previous Democratic challengers).

2017 special election
Kansas Governor Sam Brownback, acting on his authority, announced a special election would be held on April 11, 2017, to fill the vacancy left by Rep. Pompeo's resignation.  Republican, Democratic, and Libertarian parties would select their nominees through district caucuses, run by the respective party organizations, voting through delegates selected by their respective party rules. It would be the first Congressional election since the 2016 national election, and thus drew national attention.

Republicans nominated Kansas State Treasurer Ron Estes. Democrats nominated civil-rights attorney James Thompson, a political novice. Libertarians nominated aviation instructor Chris Rockhold, also a political novice.

Initial assumptions were that this election's outcome was a foregone conclusion: The Republican would win overwhelmingly again.  However, Democratic nominee Thompson, aided with numerous energetic supporters (particularly former local campaigners for Bernie Sanders, who had taken the 2016 Kansas Democratic Presidential Caucus by 75%), began to show signs of the first serious fourth district challenge to Republicans since Glickman's loss a quarter-century earlier.

The Thompson campaign raised about $254,000 by the final campaign finance-reporting deadline, and over 97% was from individual donors—with a last-minute infusion of only $10,000 from the state party, reflecting a lack of support from his state party and national organizations. By comparison, Estes raised about $318,000—plus another $94,000 from the National Republican Congressional Committee (NRCC) after the filing deadline—largely from outside groups and big (over $1,000) donors.

The Thompson campaign emphasized Thompson's working class progressive credentials, telling the story of his childhood poverty and use of education as a ladder to opportunity. Another a key focus was his status as a U.S. Army veteran and advocacy for Second Amendment rights, featuring images of him firing his assault rifle. The campaign strongly emphasized his desire to defend the Constitution, inferring a reference to President Trump. The Thompson campaign attempted to focus public attention on Estes' close connections to exceptionally unpopular Governor Sam Brownback. In response, Estes and the Republican party simply branded Thompson as "too liberal for Kansas." Estes' low-key campaign included refusing to attend several debates with Thompson and Libertarian candidate Rockhold. However, last-minute Republican ads—with retouched photos—depicted Thompson with House Minority Leader Nancy Pelosi, and focused on Thompson's abortion-rights beliefs (rather falsely, Thompson and some others argued, but essentially accurate, others have said), with apparent impact.

In the last two weeks of the election, Republicans responded with a flurry of ads, especially abortion-focused ads, largely from national Republican party organizations. Robo-calls from President Trump and Vice President Mike Pence flooded the fourth district, and Senator Ted Cruz—who had won the 2016 Kansas Republican presidential caucus—made a last-minute visit to the district to stump for Estes.

On election day—although advance voting returns indicated a substantial lead for Thompson, and Thompson narrowly secured a majority of the total Sedgwick County vote—a final tally of the in-person votes, combined with the advance ballots, eventually sorted out to give Estes (at 53% of the vote) the victory over Democrat Thompson (with 45% - about 8,500 fewer votes) and Libertarian Rockhold (at 2%, about 1,900 votes total).

It was the closest that Democrats had come to retaking the seat since Glickman's 1994 loss, and though clearly the Republican won, analysts described the unusually close race as a sign of trouble for Republicans in the fourth district, and in Kansas, and nationally.

Thompson immediately announced plans to run for the seat, again, in 2018.

2018 regular election
In the 2018 election, the district's Republican incumbent for Congress was Representative Ron Estes.  He was challenged in the primaries by a candidate with a similar name, Ron M. Estes. This led to a conundrum as to how the candidates should be distinguished on the ballot, with Kansas Secretary of State Kris Kobach claiming that Ron G. Estes can include the prefix "Rep." on the ballot according to Kansas law, although Ron M. Estes claimed that this was unfair. Ron G. Estes, the incumbent, won the primary with more than 80% of the vote. In the Democratic primary for Congress, Laura Lombard lost to James Thompson, who was defeated by Ron G. Estes in the 2017 special election. In the general election, Ron Estes was re-elected, defeating James Thompson by a large margin.

Demographics
Most of the approximately 670,000 citizens of the fourth district reside in the state's largest city, Wichita (approximate population 390,000), or the surrounding Sedgwick County (approximate population 511,000).  Nearly all live within the Wichita MSA (approximate population 650,000). The rest live in small towns and rural areas in adjacent counties, and counties farther west and east.

Following redistricting after the 2000 U.S. Census, there were 672,101 people, 261,106 households, and 177,358 families residing in the district. There were 285,830 housing units at an average density of 30.0/mi2. The racial makeup of the district is 83.56% White, 6.86% Black or African American, 2.44% Asian, 1.23% Native American, 0.05% Pacific Islander, 3.28% from other races, and 2.59% from two or more races. Hispanic or Latino people of any race were 6.57% of the population.

There were 261,106 households, out of which 36.53% had children under the age of 18 living with them, 53.87% were married couples living together, 10.14% had a female householder with no husband present, and 32.07% were non-families. 27.62% of all households were made up of individuals, and 9.99% had someone living alone who was 65 years of age or older. The average household size was 2.52 and the average family size was 3.10.

In the district the population distribution by age is 27.69% under the age of 18, 9.13% from 18 to 24, 28.98% from 25 to 44, 21.19% from 45 to 64, and 13.00% who were 65 years of age or older. The median age was 35.0 years. For every 100 females there were 97.32 males. For every 100 females age 18 and over, there were 94.67 males.

The median income for a household in the district is $40,917, and the median income for a family was $49,650. Males had a median income of $36,701 versus $25,237 for females. The per capita income for the district was $20,041. About 7.0% of families and 9.6% of the population were below the poverty line, including 12.1% of those under age 18 and 7.6% of those age 65 or over.

Among the population aged 16 years and older, 66.4% was in the civilian labor force and 0.6% were in the armed forces. Of the employed civilian workers, 12.5% were government workers and 6.7% were self-employed. Management, professional, and related occupations employed 31.5% of the work force and sales and office occupations an additional 25.5%. Only 0.5% are employed in farming, fishing, and forestry occupations.  The largest employment by industry was: manufacturing, 24.1%; educational, health and social services, 20.8%; and retail trade, 11.0%. Agriculture, forestry, fishing and hunting, and mining industries only employed 2.0%.

List of members representing the district

Election results from recent statewide races

Recent election results

2002

2004

2006

2008

2010

2012

2014

2016

2017 special election

2018

2020

2022

Historical district boundaries

In 2012, in an unusual move, the federal courts intervened in Kansas's decennial redistricting (required by law to adjust boundaries of Congressional and state legislative districts every 10 years, to reflect changing population distributions, as reported by the decennial census).

Sharply criticizing the Legislature for the intractable feud between conservative and moderate factions in the Kansas Legislature (normally responsible for redistricting), and recognizing the rapidly approaching next elections, a federal three-judge panel (the Chief Justice of the 10th Circuit Court of Appeals and two judges from the Kansas City U.S. District Court) drew the Kansas state and Congressional district boundaries themselves, in rather simple and direct shapes that produced radical changes.

In the process, the 4th congressional district shifted west—still centered approximately on (and demographically dominated by) Wichita, The district's previous eastern boundary – Montgomery County and part of Greenwood County – were moved into another district, while the 4th district's western edge moved farther west, to include all of Pratt, Stafford, Barber, Kiowa, Comanche and Edwards counties, plus a slender section of southern Pawnee County. In the process, the Fourth acquired a more neatly rectangular shape, and sharply reduced the amount of counties divided between the Fourth and another district.

The map shown here indicates prior boundaries.

See also

Kansas's congressional districts
List of United States congressional districts

References

04
Barber County, Kansas
Butler County, Kansas
Chautauqua County, Kansas
Comanche County, Kansas
Cowley County, Kansas
Edwards County, Kansas
Elk County, Kansas
Greenwood County, Kansas
Harper County, Kansas
Harvey County, Kansas
Kingman County, Kansas
Kiowa County, Kansas
Pawnee County, Kansas
Pratt County, Kansas
Sedgwick County, Kansas
Stafford County, Kansas
Sumner County, Kansas